The 72nd Directors Guild of America Awards, honoring the outstanding directorial achievement in feature films, documentary, television and commercials of 2019, were presented on January 25, 2020, at the Ritz-Carlton in Downtown Los Angeles, California. The ceremony was hosted by Judd Apatow, who also hosted the ceremony in 2018. The nominations for most of the television and documentary categories were announced on January 6, 2020, while the nominations for the feature film categories were announced on January 7, 2020. The nominations announcement for three television awards (Comedy Series, Drama Series, and Variety/Talk/News/Sports – Specials) was moved to January 10, 2020 due to a re-vote delay.

Winners and nominees

Film

Television

Commercials

Frank Capra Achievement Award
 Duncan Henderson

Franklin J. Schaffner Achievement Award
 Arthur Lewis

References

External links
 

Directors Guild of America Awards
2019 film awards
2019 television awards
2019 in American cinema
2019 in American television
2020 awards in the United States